Arton Din Zekaj (born 16 April 2000) is a Kosovan professional footballer who last played as a defensive midfielder for French club Lille II.

Club career

Early career
Zekaj started playing football with Spartak Subotica. In 2015, he joined the youth system of Partizan. During the 2016–17 season, he was loaned to OFK Bačka, and although placed on the senior team, he failed to make a debut in the Serbian SuperLiga. On 14 February 2018, Zekaj joined Serbian League Belgrade side Sopot.

Lille
On 4 July 2018, Zekaj signed a three-year contract with Ligue 1 club Lille. On 11 August 2018, he made his debut as professional footballer in a 3–1 home win against Rennes after coming on as a substitute at last minutes in place of Lebo Mothiba. Seven day later, Zekaj made another debut with Lille, but with second team in a Championnat National 2 match against Épinal after being named in the starting line-up.

International career

Youth

Serbia
Zekaj was a member of Serbia U15 from 2014 until 2016, when he was promoted to Serbia U16. In 2017, he became part of Serbia U17 and in some matches played with the Serbia national youth teams was squad captain.

Kosovo

On 3 April 2017, Zekaj visited Pristina together with his father, a consultant and a representative of Partizan and met with the leaders of the Football Federation of Kosovo. The meeting was held to clarify procedures to enable him to play for Kosovo national team.

Under-21

On 27 April 2019, The Football Federation of Kosovo confirmed through a communiqué that Zekaj is obtained with the Kosovan passport and is ready to play for Kosovo national under-21 team in the next 2021 UEFA European Under-21 Championship qualification matches in September 2019.

Zekaj was planned to be called up from Kosovo U21 in June 2019 for 2021 UEFA European Under-21 Championship qualification matches against Andorra U21 and Turkey U21, but due to injury, could not be part of the national team.

On 2 September 2019, he received a call-up from Kosovo U21 for the 2021 UEFA European Under-21 Championship qualification match against England U21 and made his debut after being named in the starting line-up.

Personal life
Zekaj was born in Subotica, Serbia to Kosovo Albanian parents from Has of Prizren.

Career statistics

Club

References

External links

2000 births
Living people
Sportspeople from Subotica
Association football midfielders
Kosovan footballers
Kosovo under-21 international footballers
Kosovan expatriate footballers
Kosovan expatriate sportspeople in France
Serbian footballers
Serbia youth international footballers
Serbian expatriate footballers
Serbian expatriate sportspeople in France
Albanians in Serbia
FK Partizan players
OFK Bačka players
FK Sopot players
Ligue 1 players
Championnat National 2 players
Lille OSC players